Tafsir al-Tahrir wa'l-Tanwir is a work of Qur'anic exegesis (tafsir) by Muhammad al-Tahir ibn Ashur, the contemporary Islamic scholar graduated from the University of Ez-Zitouna and the major figure within the Islamic Modernism movement. The book is a culmination of his fifty years of work, and ibn Ashur poured in all of his innovative and reformist approaches toward hermeneutical engagement. His approach is most notably characterized by his emphasis on the rhetorical aspect of the Qur'an, instead of relying completely on traditional interpretational science (riwaya) employed by other mufassirs (author of tafsir) whom ibn Ashur criticized. Ibn Ashur criticized the methodology that relies on the opinions by their predecessors without adding little scientific values, by attacking how people are delusional in concerning about the contradictions between the divine message and traditions. The book was published in 1984 through Tunisian House of Publication, consisted of 30 volumes, and considered one of the most important contemporary Qur'anic exegesis to this day.

References

Sources
 

Ibn Ashur